Drummer is an American magazine which focuses on "leathersex, leatherwear, leather and rubber gear, S&M, bondage and discipline, erotic styles and techniques." The magazine was launched in 1975 and ceased publication in April 1999 with issue 214, but was relaunched 20 years later by new publisher Jack MacCullum with editor Mike Miksche.

During the late 20th century, it was the most successful of the American leather magazines, and sold overseas. The publication had a major impact of spreading gay leather as a lifestyle and masculinity as a gay ideal. The magazine was originally focused on quality writings about leather but gradually changed into more of a photo magazine.

Among the writers and artists featured in the magazine have been Phil Andros, Tim Barrus, Scott Masters, Tom of Finland, Robert Opel, Fred Halsted, David Hurles, Rex, British artist Bill Ward, photographer Rick Castro, Larry Townsend, inkedKenny, Alexander Cheves and Race Bannon. For a while, during its initial run, it featured comic strips starring buff gay secret agent Harry Chess by Al Shapiro (under the name "A. Jay"). Photographer Robert Mapplethorpe contributed a photograph for the cover of #24, September 1978. Manga artist Gengoroh Tagame has pointed to the magazine's illustrated strips as a major influence on his own work.

History

Original run 
Drummer was founded in Los Angeles by John H. Embry and Jeanne Barney, but because of police harassment moved to San Francisco in 1977, with Jack Fritscher as new editor-in-chief. Fritscher became the magazine's most frequent contributor as editor, writer, and photographer. Subsequent editors included Robert Payne and Robert W. Rowberry.

Despite Fritscher's personal dislike for Nazism, the gay National Socialist League was allowed to advertise in Drummer during the 1970s and 1980s. Today, the magazine states a zero-tolerance policy for writers, artists, or organizations associated with hate of any kind, including racism, transphobia, and misogyny.

In Drummer, Fritscher was the first writer and editor to feature "older men" (#24, September 1978) in the gay press.

The magazine arranged yearly International Mr. Drummer contests in San Francisco from 1981 until it ceased publication in 1999. On September 18, 1990, Clive Platman (Mr. Australia Drummer) presented Tony DeBlase with an Australian version of DeBlase's creation of the leather pride flag; this version incorporated the southern cross, which is from the Australian national flag, with the original design of the leather pride flag.

Fritscher's short-story collection Corporal in Charge of Taking Care of Captain O'Malley (Gay Sunshine Press, 1984) was the first collection of leather fiction, and the first collection of fiction from Drummer. The title entry Corporal in Charge was the only play published by editor Winston Leyland in the Lambda Literary Award winner Gay Roots: Twenty Years of Gay Sunshine - An Anthology of Gay History, Sex, Politics & Culture (1991).

The magazine was sold in 1986 to Tony DeBlase, who sold it in 1991 to Martijn Bakker, owner of RoB Amsterdam.

The last regular print issue of the magazine – #214 – was published in April 1999. A complete set of this run is at the Leather Archives and Museum.

During publishing hiatus 
Jack Fritscher's eyewitness recollections and interviews of Drummer history were published in 2007 as Gay Pioneers: How Drummer Magazine Shaped Gay Popular Culture 1965-1999.

In 2008 Drummer cofounder Jeanne Barney received the Lifetime Achievement Award as part of the Pantheon of Leather Awards.

A selection of Jack Fritscher's writing in Drummer was published in 2008 as Gay San Francisco: Eyewitness Drummer. This won the National Leather Association International’s Geoff Mains Nonfiction Book Award in 2009.

In 2014 and 2015 respectively Drummer cofounders John H. Embry and Jeanne Barney were inducted into the Leather Hall of Fame.

Drummer cofounder John H. Embry was honored in 2017 along with other notables, named on bronze bootprints, as part of San Francisco South of Market Leather History Alley.

Relaunch 
Jack MacCullum, a titleholder in the D.N.A. ("Drummer North America") competitions, purchased the magazine and its associated events from Martijn Bakker in 2018, and relaunched it in October 2019 under editor Mike Miksche as a quarterly print and online publication. Jack Fritscher was a consulting editor on the first relaunch issue.

References

External links 
 Early Drummer issues on Scribd
 Drummer links at Duskpeterson.com

1975 establishments in California
LGBT-related magazines published in the United States
BDSM
Companies based in San Francisco
Gay male BDSM
Leather subculture
Magazines established in 1975
Magazines published in San Francisco